Hassan Diab (born 1 June 1959) is a Lebanese academic, engineer and politician who served as the 37th prime minister of Lebanon from 21 January 2020 to 10 September 2021. He was appointed by President Michel Aoun in 2019 to succeed Saad Hariri as prime minister. He submitted his resignation on 10 August 2020 in wake of the explosion in Beirut and served as caretaker prime minister until Najib Mikati formed a new government on 10 September 2021. Prior to his premiership, he served as the minister of education from June 2011 to February 2014 under President Michel Suleiman.

Early life and education
Diab was born in Beirut on 1 June 1959. He has a bachelor of science degree in communications engineering, which he received from Leeds Metropolitan University in 1981. Then he obtained a master's degree in systems engineering from the University of Surrey in 1982, and a PhD in computer engineering from the University of Bath in 1985.

Academic career
Diab was a career academic, joining the American University of Beirut (AUB) as an electrical engineering professor in 1985. He has published over 150 articles and papers in scientific journals and scientific conferences. He called himself an advocate for educational reform in Lebanon and authored books on the topic. He also served as vice president for regional external programs at the AUB from October 2006 to June 2011. 

On 13 June 2011, Diab was appointed minister of education and higher education as part of Najib Mikati's cabinet, replacing Hasan Mneimneh in the post. Diab's term ended on 15 February 2014, and Elias Abu Saab succeeded him in the post.

Premiership

Diab was designated as the next prime minister succeeding Saad Hariri on 19 December 2019, amidst the protests that had caused Hariri's resignation. Diab's candidacy won the support of 69 members out of 128 of the Lebanese parliament, and his support came from parties that co-form the March 8 Alliance, namely the Hezbollah-allied parliamentary blocs, but did not receive the backing of parties from his own Sunni community. 

Diab is an independent, not vocally supporting any political group, and had a low public profile at the time of his appointment.

Lebanon's new government was formed on 21 January 2020 after Diab and Parliament Speaker Nabih Berri met with President Michel Aoun. Diab then announced the new twenty-member cabinet made up of technocrats reporting that they would work on new election law, seeking an independent judiciary and the return of looted public funds. During the first session of the new cabinet, Diab announced that his first official visits would be to countries "in the Arab region, especially the Gulf". He said nothing about abiding by the reforms promised by Hariri and chose to maintain the ministry of information, which Hariri had promised to abolish. On 3 February, Diab signed the state budget for 2020, reducing spending by $700 million and on 6 February the cabinet approved a financial rescue plan to present to the parliament.

On 7 March 2020, Diab announced Lebanon would default on a sovereign debt for the first time in its history.

On 10 August 2020, Diab resigned in the aftermath of the Beirut explosion due to mounting political pressure and anger at the Lebanese government for their failure to prevent the disaster, exacerbated by existing political tensions and upheavals within the country. He requested President Aoun to call for early parliamentary elections.

Murder enquiry

On 24th January 2023, Judge Tarek Bitar charged Diab and other top officials with 'Homicide with intent' under the probe into the Beirut explosion in 2020. Judge Bitar also charged Prosecutor General Ghassan Oweidat - the head of Lebanon's domestic intelligence agency Major General Abbas Ibrahim, former army commander Jean Kahwaji and other current and former security and judicial officials.

Personal life
Diab is married to Nuwar Mawlawi and has three children. He is a Sunni Muslim.

Selected publications

References

External links

Prime Ministers of Lebanon
1959 births
Alumni of Leeds Beckett University
Alumni of the University of Bath
Alumni of the University of Surrey
Academic staff of the American University of Beirut
Independent politicians in Lebanon
Education ministers of Lebanon
Lebanese engineers
Lebanese Sunni Muslims
Living people
People named in the Pandora Papers
Politicians from Beirut
21st-century Lebanese politicians